Arena/Maze of Death (known in Europe as Arena) is an isometric action video game created by Eden Entertainment Software for the Sega Game Gear. Players have to play the role as a one-person mercenary squad who is trapped in heavily guarded and deadly areas with the primary goal of surviving. This game was released late in the Game Gear's life span.

Setting

The setting is a futuristic city in the year 2026.

A television broadcasting company called Astralnet Broadcasting Company (ABC) was created to brainwash the population. A pro-democratic sympathizer, Guy Freelander, is charged with the task of navigating through a warehouse district, an industrial park, and an old abandoned train station in order to enter a high-rise building through a weakly defended "back door" and broadcast proof of an evil corporation's wrongdoings over the television stations.

Reception
The four reviewers of Electronic Gaming Monthly commented on how advanced the game's graphics are, saying that it looks better than even many contemporary Sega Genesis games. Most of them also praised the complexity and fun of the gameplay, and said it was the best Game Gear release to come out in months. They gave it an average score of 8 out of 10.

In a retrospective review for Allgame, Jonathan Sutyak gave Arena: Maze of Death a rating of 4 out of 5 stars. He praised the open exploration of levels, password feature, easy controls, and advanced graphics, and concluded that the game "will appeal to action and adventure fans alike."

References

1996 video games
Action video games
Game Gear games
Game Gear-only games
Science fiction video games
Video games developed in the United Kingdom
Video games set in the 2020s
Video games with isometric graphics
Fiction about mind control